The Rajya Sabha, or Council of States, is the upper house of the Parliament of India. Every state and union territory of India has been allocated some seats according to the Indian Constitution, and Puducherry is allocated one seat in the house, which is indirectly elected by members of the Puducherry Legislative Assembly. The seat elected to the house is determined by the number of seats a party possesses in the assembly during nomination.

List of the members of parliament

See Also
 Puducherry Lok Sabha constituency
 Rajya Sabha Election in Puducherry
 Elections in Puducherry

References

External links
Rajya Sabha homepage hosted by the Indian government
List of Sitting Members of Rajya Sabha (Term Wise) 
MEMBERS OF RAJYA SABHA (STATE WISE RETIREMENT LIST) 

Puducherry
 
Rajya Sabha